Milan Srbijanac (born 14 October 1998) is a Serbian footballer, playing for Inđija.

Club career

Inđija
Born in Novi Sad, Milan is a product of FK Inđija youth sistem. He joined the first team in 2015 and made his first official appearance for the club in 4–0 victory against ČSK Čelarevo on 24 October 2015, in 11 fixture of the 2015–16 Serbian First League season. For the first season he performed as a senior, Srbijanac collected 16 league matches, 10 in the first squad and 6 as a back-up player. He also played in a cup matches against Rad and Vojvodina. In summer 2016, Srbijanac signed a two-year scholarship contract with club. Srbijanac also started the 2016–17 Serbian First League season with the first team, but due to eligibility for playing with youth, he was mostly used as a back-up player. He scored his first senior goal on 11 March 2017, in 2–1 away victory against Sloboda Užice.

International career
In September 2016, as a coach of Serbia U18 national level, Ivan Tomić invited Srbijanac into the squad for friendly matches against Hungary. He also played in a 0-4 defeat against the Netherlands on 8 October 2015.

Career statistics

Club

References

External links
 

1998 births
Living people
Footballers from Novi Sad
Serbian footballers
Association football defenders
FK Inđija players
FK Zlatibor Čajetina players
FK Kabel players
Serbian First League players